MEC may refer to:

Medicine
 Mucoepidermoid carcinoma

Businesses
 MEC (media agency), a media agency network based in London and New York
 Mediterranean Exploration Company, a restaurant in Portland, Oregon
 Mongolia Energy Corporation, a mining company
 Morgan Electro Ceramics, a ceramics manufacturing company
 Mountain Equipment Co-op, a defunct Canadian outdoors gear & clothing retail co-operative
 MEC Canada, its successor
 Myanmar Economic Corporation, a Burmese military-owned corporation

Education
 Manufacturing Engineering Centre, Cardiff University, United Kingdom
 Master of Economics (M.Ec.), a postgraduate degree
 Midland Empire Conference, a high school activity conference in Missouri, USA
 Model Engineering College, Cochin, Kerala, India

Politics
 Member of the Executive Council, a member of the South African provincial government
 Ministry of Education (Brazil), the Brazilian education ministry

Religion
Methodist Episcopal Church, the progenitor of present-day Methodist denominations in the Americas
Metropolitan Evangelistic Church, a Methodist denomination in the holiness movement

Transport
 Eloy Alfaro International Airport (IATA airport code), Manta, Ecuador
 Maine Central Railroad (reporting mark), a former railroad in Maine, U.S.
 Meols Cop railway station (National Rail code), Merseyside, England

Technology
 Media Expansion Card, a type of PCIe computer expansion card
 Microbial electrolysis cell, a type of bioelectrochemical system
 Multi-access edge computing, a network architecture concept

Other
 Marginal efficiency of capital, an economics theory
 Measured environmental concentration of a substance in an environmental sample
 MEC (basketball), Maison d'Enfants Club, a professional basketball club in Casablanca, Morocco
 Mec, Poland
 Mountain East Conference, a U.S. college athletic conference
 Munitions and explosives of concern, unexploded ordnance
 Motor Enthusiasts Club, motor club in the Republic of Ireland